The Fantasist is a 1986 thriller film written and directed by Robin Hardy. The film stars Moira Sinise, Christopher Cazenove and Timothy Bottoms. It is based on the 1983 novel Goosefoot by Irish author Patrick McGinley.

Plot
An Irish woman moves from the suburbs to Dublin and begins receiving phone calls from a stranger while the city is being plagued by a serial killer who uses this method to lure his victims in. Even though she is aware of this, she finds herself drawn to the caller. An American teacher (Timothy Bottoms) living in her building comes under suspicion.

Cast
 Moira Sinise (credited as Moira Harris) as Patricia Teeling 
 Christopher Cazenove as Inspector McMyler
 Timothy Bottoms as Danny Sullivan
 John Kavanagh as Robert Foxley
 Mick Lally as Uncle Lar
 Bairbre Ní Chaoimh as Monica Quigley
 Jim Bartley as Hugh Teeling
 Deirdre Donnelly as Fionnuala Sullivan
 Liam O'Callaghan as Farrelly
 Ronan Wilmot as Patricia's Father
 May Giles as Patricia's Mother
 Se Ledwidge as Patsy Teeling
 Dervla Kirwan as Fiona

Production
Bob Geldof was originally cast to appear in the film but did not end up being involved in the production.

References

External links
 

1986 films
1980s mystery thriller films
1980s serial killer films
1980s slasher films
Irish slasher films
British slasher films
British mystery thriller films
Irish mystery thriller films
ITC Entertainment films
1980s English-language films
English-language Irish films
Films based on Irish novels
Films based on mystery novels
Films based on thriller novels
Films set in Ireland
Films shot in Ireland
British serial killer films
1980s British films